Ranidel Rozal de Ocampo (born December 8, 1981) is a Filipino former professional basketball player and assistant coach for the TNT Tropang Giga of the Philippine Basketball Association (PBA). He is the younger brother of Yancy de Ocampo where both played together with FedEx and Talk 'N Text. He also represented the Philippine national basketball team.

College career
De Ocampo started playing organized basketball at the Saint Francis of Assisi College System Doves together with his brother, Yancy. The De Ocampo brothers led the varsity squad to several NCRAA titles. Upon the exit of the older De Ocampo, the Doves were still dominating the league with him, alongside Ervin Sotto and Al Vergara. Thus, he led the squad into several statistical categories such as scoring and rebounding. He won four NCRAA MVP plums making him arguably the finest player in the history of the NCRAA.

Professional career
In 2004, after a celebrated collegiate career at St. Francis, De Ocampo decided to turn pro and enter the PBA draft. He was selected by the FedEx Express as the fourth overall pick, having selected ahead of higher profile players such as decorated UE point guard Paul Artadi, multi-titled PBL veteran Gary David and former Ateneo Blue Eagles star Wesley Gonzales.

During his rookie year, he played alongside his brother Yancy. He played in a total of 59 games and averaged decent rookie numbers of 7.5 points and 4.6 rebounds while playing a little over 21 minutes of action per game.

After a so-so performance in his first year, he made an impact in the 2005–06 season by improving his rookie numbers of 7.5 points per game to 13.3 in his sophomore year in 37 of 51 games played. He also registered 6.7 rebounds and 2.4 assists in that year.

In 2008, de Ocampo was again included in the RP Training Pool, his second stint, assembled by the PBA under Coach Yeng Guiao.

In the middle of the 2008–09 PBA Philippine Cup, he was traded to the Talk 'N Text Tropang Texters for veteran Don Allado. His all-around play helped them beat the Alaska Aces in that conference's finals series, 4-3, earning him his first PBA title.

In 2015, de Ocampo led the Texters to the 2015 PBA Commissioner's Cup championship, winning a seven-game series against Rain or Shine Elasto Painters. On April 29, 2015, de Ocampo was named as the Finals MVP. During the series, he averaged 24.3 points and 6.6 rebounds and as well as shooting at an impressive 40% from the three-point area over the course of seven games.

On September 11, 2017, de Ocampo was dealt to the Meralco Bolts along with KaTropa's 2019 second round pick for Justin Chua and Norbert Torres in a three-team trade with Phoenix and Meralco.

On April 13, 2020, de Ocampo announced his retirement from professional basketball.

PBA career statistics

Season-by-season averages

|-
| align="left" | 
| align="left" | FedEx
| 59 || 21.3 || .585 || .313 || .702 || 4.6 || 1.2 || .5 || .3 || 7.5
|-
| align="left" | 
| align="left" | Air21
| 51 || 30.4 || .483 || .377 || .763 || 6.7 || 2.4 || .8 || .3 || 13.3
|-
| align="left" | 
| align="left" | Air21
| 22 || 33.7 || .510 || .370 || .750 || 9.2 || 3.1 || .6 || .5 || 15.3
|-
| align="left" | 
| align="left" | Air21
| 51 || 34.0 || .419 || .290 || .680 || 7.2 || 2.5 || .8 || .4 || 12.4
|-
| align="left" | 
| align="left" | Air21/Talk 'N Text
| 45 || 31.0 || .447 || .342 || .750 || 8.0 || 2.8 || .8 || .4 || 12.0
|-
| align="left" | 
| align="left" | Talk 'N Text
| 47 || 26.8 || .504 || .333 || .783 || 6.4 || 1.8 || .5 || .3 || 12.5
|-
| align="left" | 
| align="left" | Talk 'N Text
| 49 || 23.4 || .441 || .400 || .689 || 4.9 || 1.9 || .6 || .2 || 11.9
|-
| align="left" | 
| align="left" | Talk 'N Text
| 54 || 24.0 || .408 || .364 || .811 || 4.5 || 1.4 || .4 || .3 || 11.8
|-
| align="left" | 
| align="left" | Talk 'N Text
| 53 || 27.2 || .439 || .359 || .748 || 6.3 || 1.6 || .3 || .3 || 12.7
|-
| align="left" | 
| align="left" | Talk 'N Text
| 46 || 31.1 || .424 || .409 || .820 || 6.6 || 1.5 || .6 || .7 || 15.2
|-
| align="left" | 
| align="left" | Talk 'N Text
| 48 || 29.1 || .470 || .402 || .693 || 5.8 || 2.2 || .7 || .5 || 15.1
|-
| align="left" | 
| align="left" | TNT
| 30 || 28.2 || .471 || .348 || .766 || 6.2 || 2.6 || .7 || .3 || 12.6
|-
| align="left" | 
| align="left" | TNT/Meralco
| 61 || 23.0 || .427 || .322 || .830 || 4.8 || 1.8 || .5 || .4 || 10.3
|-
| align="left" | 
| align="left" | Meralco
| 11 || 20.3 || .370 || .233 || .750 || 4.1 || 1.4 || .3 || .3 || 7.2
|-
| align="left" | 
| align="left" | Meralco
| 20 || 19.6 || .333 || .298 || .667 || 4.3 || 2.1 || .5 || .2 || 6.9
|-class=sortbottom
| align=center colspan=2 | Career
| 647 || 27.1 || .452 || .354 || .752 || 5.9 || 2.0 || .6 || .4 || 12.0

National team career
He was included in the Gilas Pilipinas roster that placed second in the 2013 FIBA Asia Championship held in Manila and earned a ticket to compete in the 2014 FIBA Basketball World Cup. De Ocampo also buried a crucial three point field goal late in the fourth quarter which secured Gilas a slot in the 2014 World Cup. In July 2016, de Ocampo announced his retirement from international basketball following the Gilas' loss to the New Zealand men's national basketball team that ended their bid to qualify for the 2016 Summer Olympics.

Coaching career
On June 29, 2020, de Ocampo was tapped as an assistant coach of TNT KaTropa.

Career achievements
 6-time PBA champion (2008–09 Philippine, 2010–11 Philippine, 2011 Commissioner's, 2012–13 Philippine, 2012–13 Philippine, 2015 Commissioner's)
 2-time PBA Finals MVP (2012–13 Philippine, 2015 Commissioner's)
 5-time National Team member
  PBA All-Rookie Team
 2000 PBL Chairman's New Top Comer
 2002 PBL Mythical Team
 Member of eight-time NCRAA champions Saint Francis of Assisi College System
 4-time NCRAA MVP

References

1981 births
Living people
Barako Bull Energy players
Basketball players at the 2014 Asian Games
Basketball players from Cavite
Meralco Bolts players
People from Tanza, Cavite
Philippine Basketball Association All-Stars
Philippines men's national basketball team players
Filipino men's basketball players
Power forwards (basketball)
Small forwards
Southeast Asian Games gold medalists for the Philippines
Southeast Asian Games competitors for the Philippines
Southeast Asian Games medalists in basketball
TNT Tropang Giga players
2014 FIBA Basketball World Cup players
Competitors at the 2003 Southeast Asian Games
Asian Games competitors for the Philippines
St. Francis Doves basketball players
Barako Bull Energy draft picks
TNT Tropang Giga coaches
Filipino men's basketball coaches